Mayfair is a 2018 South African Indian action crime drama film written by Neil McCarthy and directed by Sara Blecher. The film marks the fourth directorial venture for Sara Blecher and the film was set in the suburb of Johannesburg. The film stars Rajesh Gopie and Ronak Patani in the male lead roles. The film had its theatrical release on 2 November 2018 and received positive reviews. The film was also screened at the 62nd BFI London Film Festival and Africa in Motion Film Festival in October 2018.

Cast 

 Rajesh Gopie as Aziz
 Ronak Patani as Zaid Randera
 Shahir Chundra as Parvez
 Jack Devnarain as Jalaal
 Kelly-Eve Koopman as Ameena
 Warren Masemola as Hasan
 Wayne Van Rooyen as Mahbeer

Synopsis 
Zaid Randera (Ronak Patani) returns home to Mayfair in Johannesburg where his father Aziz (Rajesh Gopie), a money launderer is facing death threats from his creditors/lenders. Zaid has been dismissed from his job permanently and finds himself living under the shadow of his father whose status is marred by falling into a debt trap. When a murderous gang threatens the family business, Zaid is compelled into the life he'd hoped to leave behind.

References

External links 

 

2018 films
2018 action drama films
2018 crime action films
2018 crime drama films
2010s English-language films
English-language South African films
Films shot in South Africa
South African Indian films
South African action drama films
South African crime action films
South African crime drama films